Transtillaspis setata is a species of moth of the family Tortricidae. It is found in Venezuela.

The wingspan is 15 mm. The ground colour of the forewings is brownish grey, sprinkled with brown grey and with brown-grey markings. The hindwings are cream, suffused with brownish grey.

Etymology
The species name refers to the bristly sacculus and is derived from Latin setata (meaning bristly).

References

Moths described in 2013
Transtillaspis
Taxa named by Józef Razowski